Tapellaria albomarginata is a species of lichen in the family Pilocarpaceae. Known from Costa Rica, it was described as new to science in 2011.

References

Pilocarpaceae
Lichen species
Lichens described in 2011
Lichens of Central America
Taxa named by Robert Lücking